The Asian Tour 2014/2015 – Event 2 (also known as the 2014 Haining China Leather City Open) was a professional minor-ranking snooker tournament that took place between 20 and 24 October 2014 at the Haining Sports Center in Haining, China.

Ryan Day made the 107th official maximum break during his last 32 match against Cao Yupeng. This was Day's first official 147 break and also the second maximum break in the 2014/2015 season.

Stuart Bingham won his fourth Asian Tour title by defeating Oliver Lines 4–0 in the final. The Haining Open was nineteen-year-old Lines' first professional final, in his maiden year on tour.

Prize fund 
The breakdown of prize money of the event is shown below:

Main draw

Preliminary round
Best of 7 frames

Main rounds

Top half

Section 1

Section 2

Section 3

Section 4

Bottom half

Section 5

Section 6

Section 7

Section 8

Finals

Century breaks 

 147, 139  Ryan Day
 137, 137, 114, 102, 101  Stuart Bingham
 136  Jimmy White
 130  Ross Muir
 127  Liang Wenbo
 126, 123  Ding Junhui
 123, 106  Graeme Dott

 121  Tian Pengfei
 120, 113  Oliver Lines
 115  Mark Davis
 114, 101, 100  Jimmy Robertson
 113, 100  Zhao Xintong
 104  Joe Perry
 102  Matthew Selt

References

External links
 2014 Haining China Leather City Asian Tour – Pictures by Tai Chengzhe at Facebook

Haining Open
AT2
2014 in Chinese sport
Snooker competitions in China
October 2014 sports events in China